The women's 800 metres at the 2014 IAAF World Indoor Championships took place on 7–9 March 2014.

Medalists

Records

Qualification standards

Schedule

Results

Heats
Qualification: The winner of each heat (Q) and next 3 fastest (q) qualified.

Final

References

800 metres
800 metres at the World Athletics Indoor Championships
2014 in women's athletics